Laishram Sarita Devi (born 1 March 1982) is an Indian boxer from Manipur. She is a national champion and a former world champion in the lightweight class. In 2009, she was awarded Arjuna award by the government of India for her achievements.

Early life
Sarita Devi was born in Khunou Thoubal into a Meitei Hindu family, as the sixth of eight siblings. She used to spend her time helping her parents in collecting firewood and in the fields, which helped her build the stamina she has today. Sarita completed her high school in Waithou Mapal High School till the eighth standard and then went to Bal Baidya Mandir, Thoubal to complete her matriculation. She then went to an open-school to complete her twelfth standard to cope with her busy boxing schedule.

Career
Devi turned professional in boxing in 2000, inspired by the achievements of Muhammad Ali. The following year, she represented India at the Asian Boxing Championships in Bangkok, and won a silver medal in her weight class.  Following this victory, she won medals in various tournaments, including a gold at the 2006 World Championships in New Delhi. In 2005, she was offered the post of Sub-Inspector (SI) by the police department of Manipur, for winning a bronze medal in the 3rd World Women Boxing Championship, Russia and was promoted to the rank of DSP in February, 2010. She also won the silver medal at the 2014 Commonwealth Games in Glasgow.

She failed to qualify for 2016 Rio Olympics, after losing to Victoria Torres, with a score of 0–3. In 2018, she won Silver Medal at Indian Open International Championships, New Delhi and bagged a Gold Medal at Sr. National Boxing Championships, Rohtak. She also won in Women's World Boxing Championship with a split 4-0 verdict against Sandra Diana.

2014 Asian Games controversy
Devi entered the 2014 Asian Games in Incheon, South Korea, competing in the lightweight category. With a win margin of 3–0 both in the Round of 16 and Quarterfinals, she entered the semifinals to face South Korea's Park Ji-Na on 30 September. After the match, she was handed a 0–3 defeat verdict by the judges of the match, which turned out to be hugely controversial, considering that Devi had knocked Park out in the third round and also a convincing fourth round, before having rained heavy blows on Park throughout the first two rounds. Following this, the Indian team lodged a protest against the decision, which was rejected by the AIBA's technical committee. At the medal awarding ceremony, Devi refused to accept her bronze medal and handed it over to the silver medallist, Park. However, she accepted the medal later. This was followed by provisional suspension of her coaches by the AIBA. She was handed a one-year ban by the AIBA.

References

Indian women boxers
Sportswomen from Manipur
Recipients of the Arjuna Award
Living people
1985 births
Asian Games medalists in boxing
Boxers at the 2014 Asian Games
AIBA Women's World Boxing Championships medalists
Asian Games bronze medalists for India
Commonwealth Games silver medallists for India
Boxers at the 2014 Commonwealth Games
Commonwealth Games medallists in boxing
People from Imphal West district
Medalists at the 2014 Asian Games
Boxers from Manipur
Lightweight boxers
21st-century Indian women
Medallists at the 2014 Commonwealth Games